Edgar Jaime Pereira Bartolomeu (born September 14, 1976) is an Angolan born Canadian former professional soccer player who played as a defender and midfielder.

Playing career

Early career 
Bartolomeu started off playing Futsal in 1992 in Portugal with the Sporting Clube de Portugal youth team. After moving to Canada, he signed with the North York Astros of the Canadian Professional Soccer League. He made his debut on October 4, 1998, in a semi-final playoff match against the Toronto Olympians. 

In 1999, he signed a professional contract with the Toronto Lynx. He made his debut on May 2, 1999, in a match against the Minnesota Thunder. The following season Bartolomeu helped the Lynx finish third in the Northeastern division which clinched a playoff berth for the club for the second time in the franchise's history. In the postseason the Lynx reached the eastern conference finals but were eliminated by the Rochester Rhinos.

The following year, Bartolomeu returned to the CPSL and signed with the expansion franchise the Brampton Hitmen. He made his debut for the club on July 27, 2001, in an Open Canada Cup match against St. Catharines Wolves.

MLS and USL 
In 2002, he played for the Long Island Rough Riders in the USL Pro Soccer League, helping them to a championship and division title. After the conclusion of the indoor season, he trained with the MetroStars of the Major Soccer League during the preseason and was ultimately signed to a contract. Originally he was signed by Chicago Fire but given to New York for the rights of Andy Williams. In his debut season, he played 18 games in total for the team. He also started in the 2003 U.S. Open Cup final against Chicago were New York was defeated. 

The MetroStars recalled him for preseason and paid the Philadelphia Kixx for his full player rights but ended up releasing him before the 2004 season started, prompting him to return to the Philadelphia Kixx. In 2004, Bartolomeu, returned to the Toronto Lynx and his signing was announced on April 16, 2004. He re-signed with Toronto for the 2006 season which marked their final season in the USL First Division. During the 2006 season, he helped Toronto reach the 2006 Open Canada Cup final against Ottawa St. Anthony Italia.

Indoor career 
In the winter of 2001, he signed with the Buffalo Blizzard in the National Professional Soccer League. That same year the NPSL ceased operation and several of its remaining teams formed the Major Indoor Soccer League, but the Blizzard declined to participate and folded at that time. Edgar was then picked on the dispersal draft by the Philadelphia Kixx for the 2001/2002 indoor season, being an important part of the team's first-ever championship.  

He returned to Philadelphia for the 2006/07 indoor season which marked his fifth season with the club. In his final season in Philadelphia, he assisted in securing his second indoor championship title. After a six-year hiatus, Edgar returned to the Major Indoor Soccer League for the 2013/2014 season to play with Rochester Lancers. He re-signed with Rochester for the following season.

International career 
Bartolomeu was originally born in Angola and later became a Canadian citizen which potentially allowed him to represent the Canada men's national soccer team. In 2004, he was called to the Canada national team camp held in Florida by head coach Frank Yallop.

Honors
Major Indoor Soccer League Champions: 2001/2002
USL D3-Pro League Champions: 2002
USL D3-Pro League Atlantic Division Champions: 2002
Major Indoor Soccer League Champions: 2006/2007

References

External links
 Bartolomeu statistics
Profile of Edgar Bartolomeu
 Lancers Profile

1976 births
Living people
Angolan expatriate footballers
Angolan expatriate sportspeople in Canada
Angolan expatriate sportspeople in the United States
Angolan footballers
Brampton Stallions (Hitmen) players
Buffalo Blizzard players
Canadian Soccer League (1998–present) players
Expatriate soccer players in Canada
Expatriate soccer players in the United States
Association football defenders
Long Island Rough Riders players
Major League Soccer players
National Professional Soccer League (1984–2001) players
New York Red Bulls players
North York Astros players
Philadelphia KiXX (2001–2008 MISL) players
Soccer people from Ontario
Toronto Lynx players
USL First Division players
USL Second Division players
A-League (1995–2004) players